Meudon is a municipality in the southwestern suburbs of Paris, France. It is in the département of Hauts-de-Seine. The city is known for many historic monuments and some extraordinary trees. One of them, the Imperial Cedar, attracted the attention of Empress Eugénie and Queen Victoria. As of March 2021, the tree is in good condition, but it is threatened by real estate speculation. Another real estate project is planned for the historic park of the Napoleon III villa built by Charles Schacher. Both projects are controversial and have aroused local opposition.

Geography

The town of Meudon is built on the hills and valleys of the Seine. The wood of Meudon lies for the most part to the west of the town. The north-west part of Meudon, overlooking the Seine, is known as Bellevue ("beautiful view").

History
At Meudon, the argile plastique clay was extensively mined in the 19th century. The first fossil of the European diatryma Gastornis parisiensis was discovered in these deposits by Gaston Planté.

Archaeological sites show that Meudon has been populated since Neolithic times.

The Gauls called the area Mol-Dum (sand dune), and the Romans Latinized the name as Moldunum.

The handsome Galliera Institutions, on the hill of Fleury, were founded by the duchess of Galliera for the care of aged persons and orphans. The buildings were completed in 1885.

The old castle of Meudon was rebuilt in Renaissance style in the mid-sixteenth century. It was bought by Louis XIV as a residence for his son Louis, the Dauphin under whom Meudon became a center of aristocratic life. After the death of the Dauphin in 1711, the château was neglected, emptied in the Revolutionary sales, and finally burned in 1871 at the close of the Franco-Prussian War, while it was occupied by Prussian soldiers. A branch of the Paris Observatory was founded on the ruins in 1877.

Automotive pioneering
Nicolas-Joseph Cugnot, the inventor of the 'world's first automobile', is reported to have carried out some early trials at Meudon in the early 1770s.

Pioneering aviation
Chalais-Meudon was important in the pioneering of aviation, initially balloons and airships, but also the early heavier-than-air machines. A Corps d'Aérostatiers under the command of Jean-Marie-Joseph Coutelle was established in 1794, its balloons being used at the Battle of Fleurus. 'Hangar Y' (at ) was built in 1880 at the request of the military engineer Captain Charles Renard (1847–1905), for the construction of balloons and airships. The airship La France, designed by Renard and Arthur Krebs, was built in Hangar Y in 1884 and was the first airship which was controllable during flight and which could return to its starting point.

Population

Economy
Although a choice residential district, access to the railway (RER) and the Seine river have made Meudon a manufacturing center since the 1840s. Metal products and military explosives have been continuously produced there since then.

Scientific facilities
In addition to the Observatory, what is today ONERA, a national aerospace research institute and wind tunnel has been present since the military opened its aerostatic (lighter-than-air) field in the Chalais park in 1877. From 1921 to 1981 the Air Museum was located here until it moved to Le Bourget Airport.

CNRS has a campus in Bellevue.

Public transport
Meudon is well served by public transport operated jointly by the SNCF and the RATP.

Réseau Express Régional (RER) – Line C 
Meudon is served by line C of the RER by Meudon – Val Fleury station.

Transilien – Line N 
Meudon is also served by the Transilien Line N through Meudon station and Bellevue station.

Tramway – T2 and T6 
The T2 tramway line links Pont de Bezons station to Porte de Versailles station. It stops by La Défense. Meudon is served by Brimborion and Meudon-sur-Seine stations.

The T6 tramway line runs from Châtillon to Viroflay. Meudon is served by Georges Millandy and Meudon la Forêt stations.

Buses 
Meudon is served by twelve lines of the RATP bus network, that have numerous stops in the city:
 Line 162 runs from Arceuil – Cachan RER station to Villejuif Louis Aragon.
 Line 169 runs from Pont de Sèvres to the Georges Pompidou hospital.
 Line 179 runs from Pont de Sèvres to the Robinson RER station.
 Line 190 runs from Petit Clamart to Mairie d'Issy.
 Line 289 runs from Porte de Saint-Cloud to Clamart – Cité de la Plaine.
 Line 290 runs from Le Plessis-Robinson to Issy-Val-de-Seine.
 Line 291 runs from Pont de Sèvres to Vélizy Europe Sud.
 Line 379 runs from Vélizy 2 to Antony – La Croix de Berny RER station.
 Line 389 runs from Pont de Sèvres to Meudon-la-Forêt.
 Line 390 runs from Vélizy Villacoublay to the Bourg-la-Reine RER station.

The area was once served by the Bellevue funicular, a model of which is in the local Museum of Art and History.

Education
Public schools:
 Three groups of preschools and elementary schools
 Nine standalone preschools
 Six standalone public elementary schools
 Three junior high schools: Collège Armande Béjart, Collège Bel Air, Collège Rabelais
 Two senior high schools: Lycée Rabelais and Lycée des métiers Les Côtes de Villebon

Private schools:
 One junior and senior high school Institut Notre-Dame
 One elementary school through junior high school
 Three preschools-elementary schools

International relations

Meudon is twinned with:

 Brezno, Slovakia
 Celle, Germany
 Ciechanów, Poland
 Mazkeret Batia, Israel
 Rushmoor, England, United Kingdom
 Woluwe-Saint-Lambert, Belgium

Personalities
Émilie Ambre, the French opera singer, lived on an estate in Meudon bought for her by her then-lover William III of the Netherlands in 1877
 Madame de Pompadour lived in the Château de Bellevue, built for her by Louis XV in 1750; it was demolished in 1823.
 Sculptor Auguste Rodin's villa "des Brillants", now a museum of his art, is located here, as is his grave.
 Grand Duke Boris Vladimirovich of Russia lived here in exile in Château Sans-Souci (in Bellevue), from 1920.
 Richard Wagner was a resident (No. 27 Av. du Château), and here composed The Flying Dutchman.
 Louis-Ferdinand Céline lived here until his death, and is buried in Cimetière Longs Réages, Bas Meudon.
 The 20th-century French lawyer and Islamologist Georges-Henri Bousquet (1900–1978) was born in Meudon.
 Painter May Alcott lived here until her death.
 Jean Robiquet, art historian and curator was born in Meudon 6 July 1874.
 The artist Jean Metzinger lived and worked in Meudon from around 1911, during some of the crucial years of Cubism.
 The painter Gwen John lived in Meudon from 1911 until just before her death in 1939.
 Artists Jean Arp and Sophie Taeuber-Arp were resident here from 1929 to 1940. Their neighbours were the artist and architect Theo van Doesburg and his wife Nelly.
 The town has a monument to Rabelais who died here as canon of Meudon, where he held the benefice from 1551 to 1552.
 Charle-Michel Marle, mathematician, born in 1934, has lived in Meudon since 1970.
 Jean-Luc Marion was born in 1946.
 Clémence Poésy, French actress attended the bilingual alternative school La Source, Meudon, and is best known for her portrayal of Fleur Delacour in the Harry Potter and the Goblet of Fire movie.  
 Lionel Jospin, former France prime minister, was born here.
 André Kertész, photographer legend, took a famous photo of the train viaduct in Meudon.
 Marcel Dupré, perhaps the most famous French organist of the 20th century, lived and worked in Meudon. He transformed his home into a small concert hall; the current owners of the home still hold public concerts there.
 Nicolas Isimat-Mirin, footballer
 Gregoire Defrel, footballer
 Souleymane Doukara, footballer
 Adama Soumare, footballer
 Lorenzo Callegari, footballer
 Jean-Paul Sartre grew up at his maternal grandfather's house in Meudon, as recounted in his memoir The Words
 George Simeon Papadopoulos, OBE, Professor of History, Dep. Director of Education Department of OECD (1925–2012)

See also
Communes of the Hauts-de-Seine department
 A statue of François Rabelais by Georges Saupique stands in front of the Meudon town hall. François Rabelais was the parish priest of Meudon from 1551 to 1553
Chateau de Meudon

References

External links

 Ville de Meudon website
 Le musée de Meudon
 Observatoire de Paris (Paris Observatory)

Communes of Hauts-de-Seine
Hauts-de-Seine communes articles needing translation from French Wikipedia